Chato  is a small town in Cura Mori District in the province of Piura in Peru.

Notes

Populated places in the Piura Region